Chidi Chike Achebe (born 24 May 1967) is a Nigerian-American physician executive.  He is currently the chairman and CEO of AIDE (African Integrated Development Enterprise). AIDE is a Boston-based organization dedicated to the development of the African continent. 
Dr. Achebe has also served as the president and CEO of Harvard Street Neighborhood Health Center, Medical Director of Whittier Street Health Center and as assistant professor at Tufts University School of Medicine Tufts University School of Medicine– all in Boston, Massachusetts. Achebe also serves as medical consultant; Clean water for kids – an NGO that brings fresh water to underserved communities in Liberia; and advisor for Tesfa Health, Bahirdar, Ethiopia.

Background
Born in Enugu in southeastern Nigeria, Achebe is the third child of Chinua Achebe and Professor Christie Chinwe Okoli-Achebe.  His father is regarded as the "father of modern African literature" and best known for the trilogy of classic African novels Things Fall Apart (1958); "No Longer at Ease" (1960); and "Arrow of God" (1964). In 1972, shortly after the end of the Nigerian civil war, the family moved to the U.S. for about five years while his father held professorships at American universities. They resided again in Nigeria during the 1980s, before returning to America. His younger sister Nwando Achebe is a historian and professor at Michigan State University.

Chidi Achebe is married to Maureen Okam-Achebe who is a Hematology/Oncology specialist at Harvard University's Brigham and Women's hospital. They have three sons.

Education and career
Achebe completed undergraduate studies in natural sciences, history and philosophy at Bard College; received an MPH from the Harvard School of Public Health, his MD at Dartmouth Medical School and an MBA degree at Yale University's School of Management. He also completed his residency in both Internal Medicine and Pediatrics at the University of Texas, Texas Medical Center in Houston, Texas. After several years of work at various Boston health centers, Achebe says he now sees "the struggle against inequalities in health and health care for all vulnerable, under served Americans, as the next stage of the Civil Rights movement".

Achebe was awarded the 2012 Dartmouth College Martin Luther King Award (Ongoing Category). In May, 2022, Dr. Chidi Achebe was awarded the John and Samuel Bard Award in Medicine and Science by Bard College for his work with the underserved in the US and globally. The award had previously been presented to the two-time Nobel laureate Professor Linus Pauling as well as Nobel laureate Rosalyn Sussman Yalow, Mathilde Krim and Lewis Thomas.

Selected papers and publications
 OIL: Prize or Curse (With Paul Epstein)
 AIDS: A Disease of Mass Destruction 
 AIDS: An Assault to our shared humanity 
 Contributions of the African American: A Black History Month Essay 
 Prostate Cancer and Black Men: A call to Action 
 The Polio Epidemic in Nigeria: a Public Health Emergency (2) 
 Yale School of Management: Article on the Leadership in health Care program

References

Bard College alumni
Yale School of Management alumni
Physicians from Massachusetts
Living people
Harvard School of Public Health alumni
Geisel School of Medicine alumni
American nonprofit chief executives
American health care chief executives
Chidi Chike
1967 births